Dyakonovo is a rural locality (a village) in Styopantsevskoye Rural Settlement, Vyaznikovsky District, Vladimir Oblast, Russia. The population was 15 as of 2010.

Geography 
Dyakonovo is located 35 km southwest of Vyazniki (the district's administrative centre) by road. Korovintsevo is the nearest rural locality.

References 

Rural localities in Vyaznikovsky District